Lipstick (Ascending) on Caterpillar Tracks is a weathering steel sculpture by Claes Oldenburg. 
It is located at Morse College Courtyard, at Yale University, in New Haven, Connecticut.

History
Stuart Wrede and a group of fellow Yale architecture students raised money under the name of the Colossal Keepsake Corporation of Connecticut, working in collaboration with Oldenburg, who charged no fee for his work. The piece was installed on the campus on May 15, 1969, in Beinecke Plaza, as a speakers' platform for anti-war protests. (In the autumn of 1969, women were admitted to Yale University, leading some to view the sculpture as a symbol of female empowerment and coeducation.)

The original iteration had a soft, inflated lipstick section, and wooden treads. The sculpture deteriorated and was removed by Oldenburg in March 1970. It was redone in weathering steel and fiberglass, and reinstalled at Morse College, on October 17, 1974. As of 2019, Wrede was leading an effort to move the piece back to its original location in Beinecke Plaza.

Lipstick (Ascending) on Caterpillar Tracks has been shown at the Guggenheim Museum and National Gallery of Art.

See also
 List of works by Oldenburg and van Bruggen

References

External links
http://restoringpublicpossessions.wordpress.com/2011/08/26/lipstick-ascending-on-caterpillar-tracks-1969-1974/
http://dumboartscenter.blogspot.com/2011/06/secret-garden-party-ii-sneak-peak-1.html

1969 establishments in Connecticut
1969 sculptures
Buildings and structures in New Haven, Connecticut
Sculptures by Claes Oldenburg
Sculptures by Coosje van Bruggen
Sculptures in Connecticut
Steel sculptures in Connecticut
Artworks at Yale University